Khandakar Mohammad Khurram was a Jatiya Samajtantrik Dal (Siraj) politician and the former member of parliament for Sherpur-3, Bangladesh.

Career
Khurram was elected to parliament from Sherpur-3 as a Jatiya Samajtantrik Dal (Siraj) candidate in 1986.

Death
Khurram died in 2018.

References

Jatiya Samajtantrik Dal (Siraj) politicians
2018 deaths
3rd Jatiya Sangsad members